John the Blind or John of Luxembourg (10 August 1296 – 26 August 1346), was the Count of Luxembourg from 1313 and King of Bohemia from 1310 and titular King of Poland. He is well known for having died while fighting in the Battle of Crécy at age 50, after having been blind for a decade. In his home country of Luxembourg he is considered a national hero. Comparatively, in the Czech Republic (anciently the Kingdom of Bohemia), Jan Lucemburský is often recognized for his role as the father of Charles IV, Holy Roman Emperor, one of the more significant Kings of Bohemia and one of the leading Holy Roman Emperors.

Early life
John was the eldest son of Henry VII, Holy Roman Emperor and Margaret of Brabant, who was the daughter of John I, Duke of Brabant and Margaret of Flanders. Born in Luxembourg, raised in Paris, John was French by education, but deeply involved in the politics of Germany.

In 1310, his father arranged the marriage of 14-year-old John to Elizabeth of Bohemia. The wedding took place in Speyer, after which the newlyweds made their way to Prague accompanied by a group led by the experienced diplomat and expert on Czech issues, Peter of Aspelt, Archbishop of Mainz. Because the Emperor had imperial Czech regiments accompany and protect the couple from Nuremberg to Prague, John was thus forced to invade Bohemia on behalf of his wife Elizabeth. The Czech forces were able to gain control of Prague and depose the reigning king, Henry of Gorizia, King of Bohemia, on 3 December 1310. The deposed King Henry fled with his wife Anne of Bohemia (the sister of John's wife) to his duchy (the Duchy of Carinthia). The coronation of John and Elizabeth to the Bohemian throne took place on 7 February 1311, making them hence King and Queen of Bohemia. The castle at Prague was uninhabitable so John made residence in one of the houses on the Old Town Square, and with the help of his advisors, he stabilized affairs in the Czech state. He thereby became one of the seven prince-electors of the Holy Roman Empire and – in succession of his brother-in-law Wenceslaus III of Bohemia – claimant to the Polish and Hungarian throne. His attempts to follow his father as King of the Romans failed with the election of Louis IV of Bavaria in 1314. Nevertheless, John later would support Louis IV in his rivalry with Frederick the Fair, King of Germany, culminating in the 1322 Battle of Mühldorf in which in return he thus received the Czech region of Egerland as a reward.

Problems with nobility 
Like his predecessor Henry, he was disliked by much of the Czech nobility. John was considered to be an "alien king" and gave up the administration of Bohemia after a while and embarked on a life of travel. He parted ways with his wife and left the Czech country to be ruled by the barons while spending time in Luxembourg and the French court.

John's travels took him to Silesia, Poland, Lithuania, Tyrol, Northern Italy and Papal Avignon. A rival of King Władysław I the Elbow-high to the Polish crown, John supported the Teutonic Knights in the Polish–Teutonic War from 1326 to 1332. He also made several Silesian dukes swear an oath of allegiance to him. In 1335 in Congress of Visegrád, Władysław's successor King Casimir III the Great of Poland paid a significant amount of money in exchange for John's giving up his claim to the Polish throne.

John's first steps as king was the re-establishment of authority and to secure peace within the country. In 1311 he was able to reach an agreement with the Bohemian and Moravian aristocracy which is referred to as the "inaugural diplomas" with which John restricted the relations of both the ruler and aristocracy. The aristocracy was however allowed to hold the right to elect the king, to decide the matter of extraordinary taxation, the right to their property, and the right to choose freely whether or not to offer military support to the king in foreign wars. Although the aristocracy was encouraged to raise armies when peace within the country was threatened. On the other hand, the king's right to appoint a foreign official to office was abolished. John structured these agreements to provide a basis for the consolidation of the ruler's power within the Bohemian kingdom. The agreements weren't as successful as John intended. The aristocracy did not intend on surrendering its property and the influence it gained after Wenceslas II died.

The growing tensions within the aristocracy along with the lack of communication due to John's consistent absence in Bohemia led to a competition of two factions of the Czech nobility. One party, led by Jindřich of Lipá, gained the trust of John. The other party, led by Vilém Zajíc of Valdek (Latin: Wilhelmus Lepus de Waldek; German: Wilhelm Hase von Waldeck), convinced the Queen that the intent of Lord Lipá was to overthrow John. Consequently, in 1315 John had Jindřich imprisoned.

By 1318 John had reconciled with the nobility and recognised their rights along with taking a further step to establish dualism of the Estates and a division of government between the king and the nobles.

International politics 
Foreign politics, rather than Czech, appealed to John, as he was gifted at it. With the help of his father Henry, John was able to pressure the Habsburgs in reaching an agreement over Moravia. He was also able to pressure the House of Wettin, princes of Saxony, to give over the territory lying to the northern border of the Czech state. John also decided to reach out to improve the relations with the Silesian principalities, which were close, both in economic and political standings, to Bohemia and Moravia. 

The international spectrum was further broadened for John when his father named him Vicar General, his deputy for the governance of the Empire. This allowed for John to reach further and he was able to contribute to the imperial coronation along with helping with the conclusion of the Italian territorial wars.  In 1313 Henry died suddenly bringing an end to this collaboration between him and John. However, through Henry's death a spot for the imperial crown opened up making John a possible candidate, the other two candidates being Fredrick of Habsburg and Louis of Bavaria.

In attempts to not support Fredrick, John voted for Louis at the diet of electors. In return for his support, Louis, as the new emperor, promised the support in territorial claims of the Czech state in Silesia and Meissen as well as the region of Cheb and the Upper Palatinate. Later in 1319, after the Brandenburg House of Ascania died out, John regained control over the Bautzen region and then the Görlitz region in 1329.

In 1322/23 King John became unsettled by Louis's growing power and allied with France and Austria against him. The dispute would escalate with his son Charles claiming the Imperial crown in opposition to Louis.

Death 
John lost his eyesight at age 39 or 40 from ophthalmia in 1336, while crusading in Lithuania. A treatment by the famous physician Guy de Chauliac had no positive effects. At the outbreak of the Hundred Years' War in 1337 he allied with King Philip VI of France and was even governor of Languedoc from 30 November 1338 to November 1340. At the Battle of Crécy in 1346 John controlled Phillip's advanced guard along with controlling the large contingents of Charles II of Alençon and Louis I, Count of Flanders. John was killed at age 50 while fighting against the English during the battle. The medieval chronicler Jean Froissart left the following account of John's last actions:

...for all that he was nigh blind, when he understood the order of the battle, he said to them about him: 'Where is the lord Charles my son?' His men said: 'Sir, we cannot tell; we think he be fighting.' Then he said: 'Sirs, ye are my men, my companions and friends in this journey: I require you bring me so far forward, that I may strike one stroke with my sword.' They said they would do his commandment, and to the intent that they should not lose him in the press, they tied all their reins of their bridles each to other and set the king before to accomplish his desire, and so they went on their enemies. The lord Charles of Bohemia his son, who wrote himself king of Almaine and bare the arms, he came in good order to the battle; but when he saw that the matter went awry on their party, he departed, I cannot tell you which way. The king his father was so far forward that he strake a stroke with his sword, yea and more than four, and fought valiantly and so did his company; and they adventured themselves so forward, that they were there all slain, and the next day they were found in the place about the king, and all their horses tied each to other.

According to the Cronica ecclesiae Pragensis Benesii Krabice de Weitmile, when told by his aides that the battle against the English at Crécy was lost and he better should flee to save his own life, John the Blind replied: "Absit, ut rex Boemie fugeret, sed illuc me ducite, ubi maior strepitus certaminis vigeret, Dominus sit nobiscum, nil timeamus, tantum filium meum diligenter custodite. ("Far be it that the King of Bohemia should run away. Instead, take me to the place where the noise of the battle is the loudest. The Lord will be with us. Nothing to fear. Just take good care of my son.")

John was succeeded as King of Bohemia by his eldest son, Charles. In Luxembourg, he was succeeded by Wenceslaus, his son by his second wife.

Burial 

The body of John the Blind was moved to Kloster Altmünster ("Old-Minster Abbey") in Luxembourg. When the abbey was destroyed in 1543 the corpse was moved to Kloster Neumünster ("New-Minster Abbey") in Luxembourg. During the confusion of the French Revolution the mortal remains were salvaged by the Boch industrialist family (founders of Villeroy & Boch, ennobled in 1892) and hidden in an attic room in Mettlach on the Saar River. The legend has it that the monks of the abbey asked Pierre-Joseph Boch for this favour.

His son Jean-François Boch met with the future King Frederick William IV of Prussia on his voyage through the Rhineland in 1833 offering the remains as a gift. As Frederick William counted John the Blind among his ancestors, he ordered Karl Friedrich Schinkel to construct a funeral chapel. The chapel was built in 1834 and 1835 near Kastel-Staadt on a rock above the town. In 1838 on the anniversary of his death John the Blind was laid in a black marble sarcophagus in a public ceremony.

In 1945 the Luxembourg government took the chance to obtain possession of the bones. In a cloak and dagger operation, the remains were moved to the crypt of the Notre-Dame Cathedral, Luxembourg. The tomb reads ""<ref>Translation: To the greatest and best God. Here under the altar is John, King of Bohemia, Count of Luxemburg, the son of the Emperor Henry VII, father of Emperor Charles IV, and grandfather of Emperors Wenceslas and Sigismund, greatest leader by spirit. Died 1340 30 au.

Family and children

John was married twice:

First, to Elisabeth of Bohemia, the daughter of King Wenceslaus II of Bohemia. In this marriage he had the following children:
 Margaret of Luxembourg, Duchess of Bavaria (8 July 1313 – 11 July 1341, Prague), married in Straubing 12 August 1328 to Henry XIV, Duke of Bavaria
 Bonne of Luxembourg, Duchess of Normandy (21 May 1315 – 11 September 1349, Maubuisson, born "Judith"), married in Melun 6 August 1332 to John, Duke of Normandy, who later became King John II of France after her death.
 Charles IV of Luxembourg (14 May 1316 – 29 November 1378), who succeeded him as King of Bohemia and later became Holy Roman Emperor
 Ottokar ("Otto") (22 November 1318 – 20 April 1320), Prince of Bohemia
 John Henry of Luxembourg (Jan Jindřich) (12 February 1322, Mělník – 12 November 1375), Margrave of Moravia
 Anna of Luxembourg, Duchess of Austria (1323 – 3 September 1338), twin of Elizabeth, married 16 February 1335 to Otto, Duke of Austria
 Elizabeth (1323–1324)

Second (December 1334), to Beatrice of Bourbon, daughter of Louis I, Duke of Bourbon. This marriage produced one son:

 Wenceslaus I of Luxembourg (25 February 1337 – 7 December 1383), Duke of Luxembourg and later Brabant through his marriage to the heiress Joanna, Duchess of Brabant.

His illegitimate son Nicolaus was Patriarch of Aquileia from 1350 to 1358.

References

Sources

Further reading 
Neillands, Robin. The Hundred Years' War. London: Routledge, 1990.

Teich, Mikuláš. Bohemia in History. New York: Cambridge University Press, 1998. 53–55. Print.

Pánek, Jaroslav, and Oldřich Tůma. A History Of The Czech Lands. Prague: Karolinum Press, 2009. 121–25. Print.

External links
  
 
 History of some of John's 4 resting places as of 1913, when this book was written. He is now in a fifth.
 Brief history of Czech lands
 Social History in Bohemia during the 13th into the 14th century

1296 births
1346 deaths
13th-century Bohemian people
13th-century Luxembourgian people
14th-century Bohemian people
14th-century Luxembourgian people
14th-century monarchs in Europe
Luxembourgian blind people
Blind royalty and nobility
Burials at Notre-Dame Cathedral, Luxembourg
Counts of Luxembourg
Czech military leaders
House of Luxembourg
Male Shakespearean characters
Medieval child monarchs
Medieval kings of Bohemia
Monarchs killed in action
Nobility from Paris
People of the Northern Crusades
Royal reburials
Sons of emperors